The Doors Classics is a compilation album by the American rock band the Doors, released in 1985 on Elektra Records. The album is only available on vinyl and has never been issued as CD.

Critical reception

AllMusic critic William Ruhlmann rated The Doors Classics with two out of five stars in his review of the compilation album, formulating:

Track listing

Original album
All tracks are written by all four members of the Doors individually except where noted. Details are taken from the 1985 original Elektra Records release.

Personnel
Per liner notes:

The Doors
 Jim Morrison – vocals
 Robby Krieger – guitar
 Ray Manzarek – keyboard, bass
 John Densmore – drums

Technical
 Paul A. Rothchild − production on all tracks except on "Love Her Madly", and "The WASP (Texas Radio and the Big Beat)"
 Bruce Botnick − engineer, co-production (along with the Doors) on "Love Her Madly", and "The WASP (Texas Radio and the Big Beat)"

References

1985 greatest hits albums
Albums produced by Paul A. Rothchild
The Doors compilation albums
Elektra Records compilation albums